Mukhosh may refer to:
 Mukhosh (2020 film), a Bengali thriller drama film
 Mukhosh (2022 film), a Bangladeshi mystery thriller film
 Mukhosh (band), a 1990s blues band based in Dhaka, Bangladesh